Anticuchos (singular anticucho, Quechua 'Anti Kuchu', Anti: 'Eastern region of the Andes' or 'Eastern native ethnicities', Kuchu: 'Cut'; Quechua for 'Anti-style cuts', 'Eastern-style cuts') are popular and inexpensive meat dishes that originated in the Andes during the pre-Columbian era, specifically in the Antisuyu region of the Tawantinsuyu (Inca Empire). The modern dish was adapted during the colonial era between the 16th and 19th centuries and can now be found in Peru.

Anticuchos can be found on street-carts and street food stalls (anticucheras). The meat may be marinated in vinegar and spices (such as cumin, ají pepper and garlic). While anticuchos can be made of any type of meat, the most popular are made of beef heart (anticuchos de corazón). Anticuchos usually come with a boiled potato  at the end of the skewer. A similar dish, shish kebab, is found in Mediterranean cuisine. In Peru, anticuchos are linked to the procession of Señor de los Milagros.

History
Although Anticuchos are of Pre-Columbian origin, modern Anticuchos can be traced as far back as the 16th century, when they were first encountered by the Spanish conquistadors. It was at this time that European ingredients such as garlic were added, and beef began to replace the traditional llama that was used at the time of the Inca Empire. It was a popular dish among the inhabitants of the Inca Empire, and it is currently popular throughout most South American countries. Americanized versions of anticuchos are sometimes made of non-organ meats.

According to the text file from the National Library in Lima (Peru), it is believed that the term comes from the Quechua antikuchu (anti: 'East' + kuchu: 'cut' or uchu: 'porridge, mix'). The writer Erika Fetzer mentions that according to tradition, anticuchos were prepared with meat and flame. The Spanish strung the meat on sticks as skewers.

The Spaniards also brought enslaved Africans, who were concentrated in Lima and the coast of southern Chico de la Ciudad de los Reyes of the Vice-royalty of Peru.  In those days, the Spanish dismissed offal as food for slaves; the Spanish generally cooked with the "prime" cuts only. As a result, many traditional recipes use beef heart and other "off" cuts. In Peru, the tradition continues with the traditional name and ingredients; anticuchos are consumed by all social classes of Peru, and is especially popular as a street food.

Anticuchos in the Andes

Cooking
Meat and with pieces of vienna sausage and vegetables such as onions, peppers, carrots and mushrooms can be alternated on the skewer, just like cooking meat on a barbecue (asado).

They are seasoned with salt to taste, and sometimes with vinegar or lemon juice.

A popular dressing is a sauce made from garlic, onion and chopped cilantro, vinegar, lemon juice and beer, which is spread onto the anticuchos with a sprig of parsley.

Anticuchos are usually not the main course of a meal, but rather an accompaniment to grilled meats along with other side dishes such as choripanes, potatoes, sausages and salads.

Variants include smaller sticks of wood; those 15 cm or less are called "meat skewers."

Peru
Anticuchos are part of traditional Peruvian cuisine. The greatest consumption in Peru is in July, during the celebration of Fiestas Patrias (Independence day) in fondas and BBQs.

Bolivia
The Bolivian anticucho is a dish based on thin beef heart fillets marinated in spices, oil, and vinegar, cooked on skewers and over charcoal, and then served hot, mainly accompanied by roast potatoes and spicy sauce or peanut llajua. 
The anticucho is widely known as one of the favorite night delicacies dishes in innumerable parts of Bolivia. The vendors (affectionately known as "anticucheras") are easy to find on streets or boulevards and have a peculiar ritual to attract their clients, which consists of creating spectacular flames of fire that give off the irresistible aroma of the dish.

See also

 List of meat dishes
 Şiş kebap

References

External links

 Peru Taste - Anticuchos

Meat dishes
Grilled skewers
Street food
Peruvian cuisine
Bolivian cuisine